The Jiudianxia Dam is a concrete-face rock-fill dam on the Tao River in Jonê County, Gansu Province, China. The dam was constructed to conserve water and produce hydroelectricity. Construction on the dam began in 2005 and it was complete in 2008.

See also

List of dams and reservoirs in China
List of major power stations in Gansu

References

Dams in China
Hydroelectric power stations in Gansu
Concrete-face rock-fill dams
Dams completed in 2008